The president of the Parliament of Sint Maarten is the presiding officer of the Parliament of Sint Maarten. According to Article 8 of the Rules of Order of Parliament the president presides over the sittings of the House and enforces the rules prescribed in the Rules of Order of Parliament for the orderly conduct of parliamentary business. The president is supported by a team of vice presidents, divided into a first vice president and second vice president, who are also members of the House. In the event that the president is unable to lead a meeting the meeting is chaired by the first vice president.

The president of Parliament has been vacant since 4 November 2021 following the resignation of UPP party leader and MP Rolando Brison for derogatory statements he made against UPP faction leader Grisha Heyliger-Marten.

List of presidents
The following table lists the presidents of the Parliament of Sint Maarten that have been in office since Sint Maarten became a country in the Kingdom of the Netherlands on 10 October 2010:

See also
List of Sint Maarten leaders of government

References

Parliament of Sint Maarten
Politics of Sint Maarten